Sular may refer to:
 Nisoldipine, a pharmaceutical
 Sular, Iran, a village